This is a list of acronyms in the Philippines. They are widely used in different sectors of Philippine society. Often acronyms are utilized to shorten the name of an institution or a company.

Churches and Religious Institutions
ACJC – Apostolic Church of Jesus Christ
INC – Iglesia ni Cristo
LAMP – Lighthouse Apostolic Ministry of Pentecost
MCGI – Members Church of God International
UPC – United Pentecostal Church
UCCP – United Church of Christ in the Philippines
CBCP – Catholic Bishops' Conference of the Philippines

Geography
ALMASOR - Albay, Masbate, Sorsogon
BARMM – Bangsamoro Autonomous Region in Muslim Mindanao
BUDA – Bukidnon-Davao
BXU – Butuan
Calabarzon – Region; Cavite, Laguna, Batangas, Rizal, Quezon
CAMANAVA – Caloocan, Malabon, Navotas, Valenzuela (northwestern Metro Manila)
CAR – Cordillera Administrative Region
CSR – Camarines Sur
CEB – Cebu, either the province or the city
CDO – Cagayan de Oro, Northern Mindanao
CSFP – City of San Fernando, Pampanga
DVO – Davao Region
EDSA – Epifanio de los Santos Avenue, a major circumferential road (C-4) in Metro Manila
IGaCoS – Island Garden City of Samal
ILO – Iloilo, either the province or the city
LB – Los Baños, Laguna
LP – Las Piñas
LeySam – Leyte and Samar
Luzviminda – Luzon, Visayas, Mindanao
MARILAQUE – Manila, Rizal, Laguna, Quezon
Mimaropa – Region; Mindoro (Occidental & Oriental), Marinduque, Romblon, Palawan
 MisOcc – Misamis Occidental
MisOr – Misamis Oriental
MUNTAPAT – Muntinlupa, Taguig, Pateros 
MUNTIPARLAS – Muntinlupa, Parañaque, Las Piñas (southern Metro Manila)
NC – Naga City 
NCR – National Capital Region (Metro Manila)
NIR – Negros Island Region
BCD – Bacolod
 DGT – Dumaguete
NegOcc – Negros Occidental
NegOr – Negros Oriental
 QC – Quezon City
Soccsksargen – Region; South Cotabato, Cotabato, Sultan Kudarat, Sarangani, General Santos
GenSan – General Santos
VisMin – Visayas, Mindanao
ZC – Zamboanga City

Government institutions and corporations

Political parties
BAYAN – Bagong Alyansang Makabayan
KAMPI – Kabalikat ng Malayang Pilipino
KBL – Kilusang Bagong Lipunan
Lakas–CMD – Lakas–Christian Muslim Democrats
LAMMP – Laban ng Makabayang Masang Pilipino
LP – Liberal Party
PROMDI – Probinsya Muna Development Initiative
STAND-UP – Student Alliance for the Advancement of Democratic Rights in UP
UNIDO – United Nationalist Democratic Organization
UNA – United Nationalist Alliance 
NP– Nacionalista Party

Companies and commerce
BDO – Banco de Oro
CEPALCO – Cagayan Electric Power & Light Company
ETT – Enlightened Touch Trading
iBank – International Exchange Bank
LEYECO – Leyte Electric Cooperative
Meralco – Manila Electric Railway Company
NAPOCOR/NPC – National Power Corporation
NGCP - National Grid Corporation of the Philippines
PAL – Philippine Airlines
PBCom – Philippine Bank of Communications
Philtranco – Philippine Transportation Corporation
Piltel – Pilipino Telephone
PLDT – Philippine Long Distance Telephone Company
PECO – Panay Electric Company
PSBank – Philippine Savings Bank
VECO – Visayan Electric Company

Educational institutions

ADC – Academia de Davao College
ADDU – Ateneo de Davao University
AdI–SMCS – Ateneo de Iloilo – Santa Maria Catholic School
ADMU – Ateneo de Manila University
ADNU – Ateneo de Naga University
ADU – Adamson University
ADZU – Ateneo de Zamboanga University
AMACLC – AMA Computer Learning Center
AMACU – AMA Computer University
AmBriMed – American British Medical Skills Institution
AU – Arellano University
BatStateU – Batangas State University
BHNHS – Batasan Hills National High School
BU – Bicol University
BulSU – Bulacan State University
BCC – Binangonan Catholic College
CC-OC – Columban College, Inc. Olongapo City
CDGC – Child Development and Guidance Center
CDW – College of Divine Wisdom
CIS – Cebu International School
CIT-U – Cebu Institute of Technology – University
CMU – Central Mindanao University 
CPU – Central Philippine University
CSCJ – Colegio del Sagrado Corazon de Jesus
CSJL – Colegio de San Juan de Letran
CvSU – Cavite State University
DBC – Don Bosco College, Canlubang
DBTC – Don Bosco Technical College
DBTI – Don Bosco Technical Institute, Makati
DCenHS – Davao Central High School
DCHS – Davao Christian High School
DCNHS – Davao City National High School
DLSU – De La Salle University
DLS-CSB – De La Salle College of Saint Benilde
DRANHS – Daniel R. Aguinaldo High School
DWU – Divine Word University
ESEP – Engineering and Science Education Program
EVSU – Eastern Visayas State University
FAST – Filipino-American School Town
FEU-FERN – Far Eastern University - Nicanor Reyes Educational Foundation
FS – Falcon School
HSCI – Hua Siong College of Iloilo
IDC – Iloilo Doctors' College
INHS – Iloilo National High School
ISAT-U – Iloilo Science and Technology University
JBLFMU – John B. Lacson Foundation Maritime University
JNHS – Jaro National Highschool
JES1 – Jaro 1 Elementary School
JRU – Jose Rizal University
LNU – Leyte Normal University
LPU – Lyceum of the Philippines University
LSPU – Laguna State Polytechnic University
MMFC – Mindanao Medical Foundation College
MONSAY – Ramon Magsaysay High School
NCST – National College of Science and Technology
NCBA – National College of Business and Arts
NDDU – Notre Dame of Dadiangas University
NEU – New Era University
NEUST – Nueva Ecija University of Science and Technology
Pisay – Philippine Science High School
PLM – Pamantasan ng Lungsod ng Maynila
PLV – Pamantasan ng Lungsod ng Valenzuela
PLMUN – Pamantasan ng Lungsod ng Muntinlupa
PNC – Pamantasan ng Cabuyao
PNHS – Plaridel National High School
PUP – Polytechnic University of the Philippines
RCC – Republic Central Colleges
RSHS – Regional Science High School
SCS – South Crest School
SIC – Santa Isabel College
SLU – Saint Louis University
SMCM – St. Mary's College of Meycauayan
SMCQC – Saint Mary's College of Quezon City
SPC – St. Paul College (Makati, Pasig, Parañaque)
SPUI – St. Paul University Iloilo
STEFTI – St. Therese Educational Foundation of Tacloban, Inc.
TAU - Tarlac Agricultural University
TCU – Taguig City University
TSU – Tarlac State University
TUP – Technological University of the Philippines
TIP – Technological Institute of the Philippines
UE – University of the East
UI – University of Iloilo
UM – University of Mindanao
UNEP – University of Northeastern Philippines
UP – University of the Philippines
UPLB – University of the Philippines, Los Baños
UPHS-D – University of Perpetual Help System – Dalta
UPHS-J – University of Perpetual Help System – Jonelta
UPV – University of the Philippines Visayas
UPVTC – University of the Philippines Visayas Tacloban College
URS – University of Rizal System
USA – University of San Agustin
USANT – University of Saint Anthony
USC – University of San Carlos
USPF – University of Southern Philippines Foundation 
USeP – University of Southeastern Philippines
USI – Universidad de Sta. Isabel
UST – University of Santo Tomas
UV – University of the Visayas
VMUF – Virgen Milagrosa University Foundation
WIT – Western Institute of Technology
WMSU – Western Mindanao State University
WVSU – West Visayas State University
XU – Xavier University – Ateneo de Cagayan
ZMC - Zamora Memorial College

Other
ABS-CBN – Alto Broadcasting System – Chronicle Broadcasting Network
AP – Araling Panlipunan 
BLISS – Bagong Lipunan Improvement of Sites and Services
EK – Enchanted Kingdom
FFA – Football Filipinas Association, Inc.
GMA – Greater Manila Area; Global Media Arts
HUKBALAHAP – Hukbo ng Bayan Laban sa Hapon (People's Army Against the Japanese)
IBC – Intercontinental Broadcasting Corporation
MILF – Moro Islamic Liberation Front
MNLF – Moro National Liberation Front
NPA – New People's Army
MOA – Mall of Asia
NAMFREL – National Citizens' Movement for Free Elections
PTV – People's Television Network
RPN – Radio Philippines Network
PCAC – Presidential Complaints and Action Committee
PEFTOK – Philippine Expeditionary Forces to Korea

References

+ Philippines
Acronyms